Alpha Bâ (born 28 May 1989) is a Senegalese football player, who most recently played for ASC Diaraf in the Senegal Premier League.

Career
Alpha Bâ began his career with US Ouakam. He got a contract with K.A.A. Gent in Belgium in the winter 2010/11.

On 20 August 2014 he signed a contract with HB Køge in the Danish 1st Division.

References

External links
 
 Alpha Bâ at Footballdatabase

1989 births
Living people
Senegalese footballers
Senegalese expatriate footballers
Senegalese expatriate sportspeople in Belgium
Belgian Pro League players
K.A.A. Gent players
HB Køge players
Association football defenders
Senegal international footballers